Walter Fritzsch (21 November 1920 – 15 October 1997) was a German football player and manager.

Beginning 
He began his career as a player in 1927 with SC Planitz. In 1940, he transferred to VfL Leisnig and played there until 1943 after which he played for several other clubs including BC Hartha, SC Döbeln and Zwickau-Oberhohndorf. After World War II he stayed in what would become East Germany and finished his playing days with Wismut Cainsdorf in 1950.

His playing career ended due to a back injury, he became a trainer with Wismut Aue in 1950. Fritzsch then went on to work as trainer with a number of sides between 1952 and 1969 including Empor Lauter, Motor Dessau, SC Motor Karl-Marx-Stadt, SC Empor Rostock (where he earned three vice-championships), and Stahl Riesa.

Dynamo Dresden
Fritzsch joined Dynamo Dresden as trainer on 30 June 1969 and the club soon began the most successful period of its history. Under his guidance the black and yellow won five East German championships in the first division DDR-Oberliga (1971, 1973, 1976, 1977, 1978), as well as four vice-championships. The team also captured two East German Cups (FDGB Pokal) in 1971 and 1977, and made 42 European Cup appearances. During his career the small, strict trainer also coached 40 national team players and helped uncover talents such as Ulf Kirsten and Matthias Sammer.

Post Dynamo career
Fritzsch was succeeded as trainer at Dynamo by Gerhard Prautzsch and moved on to work for the DFV (Deutscher Fußball Verband der DDR or German Football Association of East Germany). Over his career he had coached 1,900 games, coming away with 1,163 victories. His opinion was still sought out by his former club Dynamo Dresden when they became one of two former East German sides to join the Bundesliga after German reunification in 1990.

Death 

Fritzsch died on 15 October 1997, shortly before his 77th birthday. The "Small General" was buried in the Heidefriedhof Dresden Cemetery. He was subsequently honored with a monument in the Rudolf Harbig Stadion, home of Dynamo Dresden, and an annual football tournament in Dresden has been organized in his memory. Today a movie filmed  movie about his career at the SG Dynamo Dresden.

References

Dynamo Dresden 1953–1983 ; Publisher's: Thom Vlg., Leipzig (1993)

External links

1920 births
1997 deaths
People from Zwickau
Dynamo Dresden managers
Footballers from Dresden
German footballers
East German footballers
FSV Zwickau players
German football managers
History of sport in East Germany
East German football managers
Chemnitzer FC managers
FC Erzgebirge Aue managers
Association football midfielders